A cotyledon (gen. ) is a significant part of the embryo within the seed of a plant, and is defined as "the embryonic leaf in seed-bearing plants, one or more of which are the first to appear from a germinating seed." The number of cotyledons present is one characteristic used by botanists to classify the flowering plants (angiosperms). Species with one cotyledon are called monocotyledonous ("monocots"). Plants with two embryonic leaves are termed dicotyledonous ("dicots").

In the case of dicot seedlings whose cotyledons are photosynthetic, the cotyledons are functionally similar to leaves. However, true leaves and cotyledons are developmentally distinct. Cotyledons are formed during embryogenesis, along with the root and shoot meristems, and are therefore present in the seed prior to germination. True leaves, however, are formed post-embryonically (i.e. after germination) from the shoot apical meristem, which is responsible for generating subsequent aerial portions of the plant.

The cotyledon of grasses and many other monocotyledons is a highly modified leaf composed of a scutellum and a coleoptile. The scutellum is a tissue within the seed that is specialized to absorb stored food from the adjacent endosperm. The coleoptile is a protective cap that covers the plumule (precursor to the stem and leaves of the plant).

Gymnosperm seedlings also have cotyledons. Gnetophytes, cycads, and ginkgos all have 2, whereas in conifers they are often variable in number (multicotyledonous), with 2–24 cotyledons forming a whorl at the top of the hypocotyl (the embryonic stem) surrounding the plumule. Within each species, there is often still some variation in cotyledon numbers, e.g. Monterey pine (Pinus radiata) seedlings have 5–9, and Jeffrey pine (Pinus jeffreyi) 7–13 (Mirov 1967), but other species are more fixed, with e.g. Mediterranean cypress always having just two cotyledons. The highest number reported is for big-cone pinyon (Pinus maximartinezii), with 24 (Farjon & Styles 1997).

Cotyledons may be ephemeral, lasting only days after emergence, or persistent, enduring at least a year on the plant. The cotyledons contain (or in the case of gymnosperms and monocotyledons, have access to) the stored food reserves of the seed. As these reserves are used up, the cotyledons may turn green and begin photosynthesis, or may wither as the first true leaves take over food production for the seedling.

Epigeal versus hypogeal development

Cotyledons may be either epigeal, expanding on the germination of the seed, throwing off the seed shell, rising above the ground, and perhaps becoming photosynthetic; or hypogeal, not expanding, remaining below ground and not becoming photosynthetic. The latter is typically the case where the cotyledons act as a storage organ, as in many nuts and acorns.

Hypogeal plants have (on average) significantly larger seeds than epigeal ones. They are also capable of surviving if the seedling is clipped off, as meristem buds remain underground (with epigeal plants, the meristem is clipped off if the seedling is grazed). The tradeoff is whether the plant should produce a large number of small seeds, or a smaller number of seeds which are more likely to survive.

The ultimate development of the epigeal habit is represented by a few plants, mostly in the family Gesneriaceae in which the cotyledon persists for a lifetime. Such a plant is Streptocarpus wendlandii of South Africa in which one cotyledon grows to be up to 75 centimeters (2.5 feet) in length and up to 61 cm (two feet) in width (the largest cotyledon of any dicot, and exceeded only by Lodoicea). Adventitious flower clusters form along the midrib of the cotyledon. The second cotyledon is much smaller and ephemeral.

Related plants may show a mixture of hypogeal and epigeal development, even within the same plant family. Groups which contain both hypogeal and epigeal species include, for example, the Southern Hemisphere conifer family Araucariaceae, the pea family, Fabaceae, and the genus Lilium (see Lily seed germination types).  The frequently garden grown common bean, Phaseolus vulgaris, is epigeal, while the closely related runner bean, Phaseolus coccineus, is hypogeal.

History
The term cotyledon was coined by Marcello Malpighi (1628–1694). John Ray was the first botanist to recognize that some plants have two and others only one, and eventually the first to recognize the immense importance of this fact to systematics, in Methodus plantarum (1682).

Theophrastus (3rd or 4th century BC) and Albertus Magnus (13th century) may also have recognized the distinction between the dicotyledons and monocotyledons.

Notes

References

Bibliography

 
 Mirov, N. T. (1967). The Genus Pinus. Ronald Press Company, New York.
 Farjon, A. & Styles, B. T. (1997). Pinus (Pinaceae). Flora Neotropica Monograph 75: 221–224.

External links
 Tiscali.reference – Cotyledon

Plant anatomy
Plant morphology
Plant reproduction
Leaves